Ignjat Nathan Fischer (18 June 1870, Zagreb – 19 January 1948, Zagreb) was a Croatian architect who was active in Zagreb during the first half of the 20th century.

Early life and education
Fischer was born in Zagreb to a Croatian-Jewish family. His father Samuel was a prominent construction engineer. Fischer studied in Vienna and Prague.

Career

In his early stage he was one of the major architects who introduced the Vienna Secession in Croatian architecture. During that phase he created several impressive designs, such as a house Rado at Strossmayer Square 7 in 1897, sanatorium in Klaićeva street known for its V-based ground plan in 1908, and building of the deanery and the institute of pathology at the Medical Faculty of Šalata in 1912.

During the Interwar period, Fischer designed in the spirit of late modernism, historicism and modestism. His greatest achievements are the forestry Academy building in Mažuranić Square 5 in 1920, city Savings bank palace at the Ban Jelačić Square in 1922–1925 (upgraded in 1931), and modern house Arko at Dolac Market.

The full extent of Fischer's work is not known with certainty. Recent research discovered a number of architectural designs that were previously not attributed to him, most notably the building of the Croatian Parliament in the St. Mark's Square. In Zagreb, he had a large studio where he designed up to forty different buildings.

Personal life
Fischer was a member of Croatian Freemasonry. He was married to Helena (née Egersrodfer) with whom he had two daughters, Ivana and Marija Magdalena. Events before and during World War II affected his health. His daughter Ivana recalled that her "father was imprisoned even when he was 70 years old, because he was a Jew. As a result of those persecutions he became seriously ill and  died in 1948." Fischer was buried at the Mirogoj Cemetery.

See also
 Ivana Fišer (daughter)

References

Bibliography

 
 
 

1870 births
1948 deaths
Architects from Zagreb
Burials at Mirogoj Cemetery
Croatian Jews
Austro-Hungarian Jews
Croatian Austro-Hungarians
Jewish architects
Croatian Freemasons